Helmut Ringelmann (4 September 1926 – 20 February 2011) was a German film and television producer.

Ringelmann was born in Munich, he produced a number of television series including the long running Der Kommissar from 1968 to 1974. He is best remembered as the Producer of the Derrick TV series.
Ringelmann died in his house in Grünwald near Munich.

References

External links
 

1926 births
2011 deaths
Mass media people from Bavaria
ZDF people